The first USS Despatch was a United States Navy schooner in commission from 1814 to 1820.

The Department of the Navy purchased Despatch in 1814. The U.S. Navy used her primarily as a survey ship in waters along the United States East Coast.

Despatch was sold in 1820.

References
 

Schooners of the United States Navy
War of 1812 ships of the United States
1814 ships